Tsonam Cleanse Akpeloo is a Ghanaian economist and technology entrepreneur. He is the CEO of SUKU Technologies and chairman for the Greater Accra Region for the Association of Ghana Industries (AGI).

Education 
Akpeloo holds a bachelor of Arts degree in economics and political science, and a master's degree in economic policy management from the University of Ghana.  He had a post-graduate degree in Management Information Systems from the Ghana Technology University, and also studied Jungian Psychology from the Institute of Humanities and Social Sciences, Gavel University, Sweden. He is a product of Clark Atlanta Business School (United States) and Stanford SEED Programme of Stanford Graduate School of Business. Akpeloo is an alumnus of the African Liberty Academy and Diplo Foundation, and holds a Diploma in Financial Management from the Chartered Institute of Marketing.

Career 
Tsonam is an IT professional and currently the chief executive officer of SUKU Technologies and acting chairman of the Association of Ghana Industries. He is also the  co-founder and chief executive officer of Techcom Visions, an IT solutions firm in Ghana. Tsonam is the national chairman of the ICT sector of the Ghana National Chamber of Commerce and Industry (GNCCI). He also acts as a board member of several institutions including and Accra Technical University, NVTI CMMTI and Methodist University College of Ghana. He is the leader of Kadodo Africa, an advanced gateway that profiles, checks, verifies and advances organizations in Ghana and Africa to situate them for the advantages of the Africa Continental Free Trade Area (AfCFTA).

Awards 
 Africa's Young Visionary Entrepreneur Award-2013 by the African Leadership Magazine-UK.
 2020 forty under 40 awards.
 USADF Grant Prize for Young African Leaders.
Young Visionary Entrepreneur Award.

References  

Year of birth missing (living people)
Living people
Place of birth missing (living people)
Ghanaian businesspeople
University of Ghana alumni